Margaret Ackerman is an American engineer who is a professor at Dartmouth College. Ackerman develops high throughput tools to evaluate the antibody response in disease states. She oversees biological and chemical engineering in the Thayer School of Engineering.

Early life and education 
Ackerman was an undergraduate student at Brandeis University where she studied biochemistry. After earning her doctorate, she spent one year at the College of Charleston, where she taught chemistry. In 2004 she moved to the Massachusetts Institute of Technology for doctoral research. Her doctorate evaluated immunotherapy in the treatment of colorectal cancer. She was appointed a postdoctoral fellow at the Massachusetts General Hospital in 2010.

Research and career 
In 2011, Ackerman joined Dartmouth College as an Assistant Professor. She was promoted to Professor in 2019. Her research considers the development of novel vaccines. Amongst these, she has worked on the development of vaccines to protect against HIV and Herpes simplex virus. Her vaccines look to make use of the innate immune system, the early response system that protects us from pathogens until our adaptive immune system responds. The ability of antibodies to recruit an innate immune response is known as the effector function. Ackerman has explored ways to engineer Regulatory T cells to target the fibrils that form in the neural tissue of people suffering from Parkinson's disease. She was awarded a Faculty Mentor Award in 2016.

During the COVID-19 pandemic, Ackerman studied the levels of antibodies in recovering COVID-19 patients. Specifically, she studied the levels of Immunoglobulin A (IgA) antibodies in their mucus. Her research identified that people who suffered from more mild cases of COVID-19 displayed increased levels of IgA. She also showed that there was an anti-correlation between levels of IgA and IgG, i.e., people with high IgA levels had low IgG levels.

Selected publications

Books

References

American women engineers

Thayer School of Engineering faculty

Living people

Year of birth missing (living people)
Massachusetts Institute of Technology alumni
Brandeis University alumni